Frederick Casey (born 10 February 1942) is an Australian boxer. He competed in the men's light heavyweight event at the 1964 Summer Olympics. At the 1964 Summer Olympics, he lost to Firmin N'Guia of the Ivory Coast.

References

1942 births
Living people
Australian male boxers
Olympic boxers of Australia
Boxers at the 1964 Summer Olympics
Boxers from Sydney
Light-heavyweight boxers